Altus (also known as Uni Centrum or Business Center 2000) is a skyscraper in Katowice, Silesia, Poland.

The construction started in 2001 and finished in 2003. The building is 125 m high and rises 30 floors above ground. Total floor area is 68,815 m², and volume is 270,430 m³. The building surrounds a four-story atrium. One wing of the building has 18 stories and the other has 29.

Altus is an intelligent building, controlled centrally through a Building Management System. There are 18 elevators in the building.

The main tenants are a four-star hotel, a casino, a health club, and banks: PKO Bank Polski, Citibank, and Kredyt Bank. There is also a three-level underground parking that can fit 560 cars. Over 1,500 people work in the building.

See also
List of tallest buildings in Poland
List of tallest buildings in Katowice

External links

The buildings's official website

Skyscrapers in Katowice
Commercial buildings completed in 2003
Skyscraper office buildings in Poland
Skyscraper hotels in Poland